Mystacoleucus ectypus is a species of cyprinid fish.

Habitat 
Freshwater

Dispersion 
Mekong River Basin

References

External links 
http://www.fishbase.org/summary/57694

Fish of Thailand
Cyprinid fish of Asia
Fish described in 2000